Windmill Hill is situated in the south of the city of Bristol and is often referred to as being part of Bedminster. It is a predominantly residential location, and became popular in the 1990s and 2000s with students, artists and environmentalists, often sharing rented accommodation. The area has mainly Victorian terraced houses though there are also two residential tower blocks Polden and Holroyd House.

In the early years of the 21st century the area started undergoing gentrification which has increased house prices in the area. Windmill Hill remains a creative and community driven neighbourhood. Windmill Hill's Community Centre was opened in the 1970s in the former church hall of St Michael and All Angels church.

Windmill Hill has given its name to a council ward, which includes Totterdown and the southern part of Bedminster.

Windmill Hill is separated from the rest of Bedminster by a railway line (and Bedminster railway station) and industrial estates as well as the Windmill Hill City Farm. The River Malago runs through the western edge of Windmill Hill ward, and Victoria Park is in the centre of the ward.

References

External links

Windmill Hill City Farm
Map of showing Windmill Hill circa 1900

Areas of Bristol
Wards of Bristol
City farms in Bristol
Places formerly in Somerset